Modern School, Nagpur is a  co-ed CBSE school based in Nagpur, India. The main unit of the school is located on Koradi Road. It is located on the outskirts of Nagpur City for Classes 1 to 12. The schools runs a Pre-Primary unit under the name of Jingle Bell Kindergarten for classes Nursery, Junior Kindergarten and Senior Kindergarten. The school has recorded 100% result for the past 12 years and is run by the J.K. Education Society.

History
The school was established in 1987. Due to the limitation of space at Civil Lines, the management acquired land near Koradi for expanding the activities of the school.

References

External links
  Official website 

Schools in Nagpur